Night Riders of Montana is a 1951 American Western film directed by Fred C. Brannon and written by M. Coates Webster. The film stars Allan Lane, Chubby Johnson, Roy Barcroft, Claudia Barrett, Arthur Space and Myron Healey. The film was released on February 28, 1951, by Republic Pictures.

Plot

Cast
Allan Lane as Rocky Lane 
Black Jack as Black Jack
Chubby Johnson as Sheriff Skeeter Davis
Roy Barcroft as Henchman Brink
Claudia Barrett as Julie Bauer
Arthur Space as Roger Brandon
Myron Healey as Steve Bauer
Morton C. Thompson as Jim Foster 
Marshall Bradford as Sam Foster
Lester Dorr as Drummer
Ted Adams as Henchman Connors
George Chesebro as Hank Jamison
Don C. Harvey as Henchman Janney 
Zon Murray as Joe

References

External links 
 

1951 films
American Western (genre) films
1951 Western (genre) films
Republic Pictures films
Films directed by Fred C. Brannon
American black-and-white films
1950s English-language films
1950s American films